Emmanuel Mensah (1990/1991 – 2017) was an American soldier from Ghana who died while saving people from a fire in The Bronx, New York City. A street was renamed after him.

References

1990s births
2017 deaths
Ghanaian emigrants to the United States
New York National Guard personnel
Deaths from fire in the United States